The 1898 USFSA Football Championship was the 5th staging of the USFSA Football Championship.

It was played on neutral grounds, in a league system with Standard Athletic Club being proclaimed champions of France after beating Club Français 3–2 in a play-off title-decider, since they had finished level on 18 points.

Table

Play-off
Standard AC and Club Français competed head-to-head for the title and both teams finished tied on 18 points, which meant that the title had to be decided in a playoff match that was held on 3 April 1898 at the Vélodrome de Courbevoie, which Standard won 3–2, thus winning for the second year straight.

Winner

References

External links
RSSSF

USFSA Football Championship
1
France